Avapessa is a commune in the Haute-Corse department of France on the island of Corsica.

The inhabitants of the commune are known as Avapessiens or Avapessiennes.

Geography

Avapessa is located some 12 km in a direct line east of Calvi and 8 km south by south-east of Algajola. Access to the commune is by road D71 from Cateri in the north which passes through the heart of the commune slightly west of the village and continues south-east to Muro. Access to the village is by the Tuvo road which branches off the D71. The commune is rugged in the west with a high country landscape while in the east there is more farmland.

Neighbouring communes and villages

Administration

List of Successive Mayors

Demography
In 2017 the commune had 82 inhabitants.

See also
Communes of the Haute-Corse department

References

External links
Avapessa official website 
Avapessa on Géoportail, National Geographic Institute (IGN) website 

Communes of Haute-Corse